"How Long Has This Been Going On?" is a 1927 song by George and Ira Gershwin for the musical Funny Face but instead introduced in the musical Rosalie.

How Long Has This Been Going On may also refer to:
 "How Long" (Ace song) from 1974, and the chorus of which is "How long / has this been going on?"
 How Long Has This Been Going On? (Sarah Vaughan album) from 1978
 How Long Has This Been Going On (Van Morrison album) from 1996
 "How Long" (Charlie Puth song) from 2017, and the chorus of which is "How long has this been going on?  You've been creepin' 'round on me."

See also
 How Long (disambiguation)